The Bilca Mare (also: Bâlca Mare) is a left tributary of the river Suceava. Its source is located in Ukraine. The river then crosses the border into Romania, joining the Suceava near the village of Bilca.

References

Rivers of Romania
Rivers of Chernivtsi Oblast
Rivers of Suceava County